The Fife Pilgrim Way is a Scottish long distance footpath that runs inland through Fife, from Culross and North Queensferry to St Andrews. The path launched on 5 July 2019.

See also
List of places in Fife
Fife Coastal Path

References

Geography of Fife
Tourist attractions in Fife